Veliki Ločnik ( or) is a settlement north of Turjak in the Municipality of Velike Lašče in central Slovenia. The entire municipality is part of the traditional region of Lower Carniola and is now included in the Central Slovenia Statistical Region.

A Roman-period burial ground has been found at a site near the settlement, but the extent of the cemetery has yet to be determined.

References

External links

Veliki Ločnik on Geopedia

Populated places in the Municipality of Velike Lašče